The discography of South Korean-born Australian recording artist Dami Im consists of six studio albums, two extended plays, eighteen singles and two album appearances. Im began her music career as a gospel singer in Korea and independently released her debut studio album, Dream, in 2010. She was the winner on the fifth season of The X Factor Australia in 2013, and subsequently received a contract with Sony Music Australia. Im released her self-titled second studio album in November 2013, which features selected songs she performed as part of the top twelve on The X Factor. The album debuted at number one on the ARIA Albums Chart and was certified platinum by the Australian Recording Industry Association (ARIA), denoting shipments of 70,000 copies. Additionally, the album also included Im's debut single "Alive", which topped the ARIA Singles Chart and was certified platinum. She became the first X Factor Australia contestant to follow up a number one single with a number one album on the ARIA Charts.

In January 2014, Im collaborated with Jessica Mauboy, Justice Crew, Nathaniel Willemse, Samantha Jade and Taylor Henderson on a cover of "I Am Australian" to coincide with the Australia Day celebrations. Their cover peaked at number 51 on the ARIA Singles Chart. Im's third studio album Heart Beats was released in October 2014. The album was preceded by its first two singles "Super Love" and "Gladiator", both of which peaked at number 11 on the ARIA Singles Chart. Upon its release, Heart Beats debuted at number seven on the ARIA Albums Chart and became Im's second top-ten album.

In August 2020, Im confirmed she had signed with ABC Music and released a new album in 2021.

Studio albums

Extended plays

Singles

As lead artist

Notes

As featured artist

Promotional singles

Other charted songs

Album appearances

Music videos

References

External links
 
 [ Dami Im] at AllMusic

Discographies of Australian artists
Discographies of South Korean artists
Pop music discographies